Jacob Stockdale (born 3 April 1996) is an Irish professional rugby union player who currently plays for Ulster and for Ireland. He plays on the wing or at fullback. He holds the record for tries scored in a single Six Nations Championship, scoring seven tries for Ireland in the 2018 tournament, for which he was also named Player of the Championship. He won the Nevin Spence Irish Young Player of the Year award in 2018, and was nominated for EPCR European Player of the Year in 2019.

Biography
He was born in Newtownstewart in County Tyrone before his family settled in Lurgan. He grew up idolising Tommy Bowe and Jonah Lomu. He attended Wallace High School in Lisburn, where he played in the back row before moving to centre. He played for the school's first team in his final year, was selected for Ireland at Schools and under-18 level, and was named Ulster Schools Player of the Year in the 2014 Ulster Rugby Awards.

He joined the Ulster academy ahead of the 2014–15 season, while studying criminology at Ulster University at Jordanstown. He made his senior debut for Ulster against Benetton in January 2016, making six appearances, including five starts, in the 2015–16 season, and was selected for Ireland under-20s in the 2016 under-20 Six Nations and the 2016 under-20 World Championship. In the 2016–17 season he made 20 appearances including eight starts, and scored nine tries. At the end of the season he was named Ulster's Young Player of the Year. He was named in the Ireland squad for the 2017 Summer Tour, and made his international debut against the United States. 

In 2017–18 he made 19 appearances for Ulster, including 18 starts, and scored ten tries. He played his first home game for Ireland in November 2017, against South Africa where he scored a try. Two weeks later in the same November series he won "man of the match" after scoring two tries in Ireland's 28–19 victory over Argentina. He was named Player of the Championship in the 2018 Six Nations Championship, after setting a tournament record for most tries scored with seven as Ireland won the Grand Slam. He was awarded the Nevin Spence Young Player of the Year award by Rugby Players Ireland in May 2018, and won BBC Northern Ireland Sports Personality of the Year in December 2018.

In 2018–19 he made twelve appearances for Ulster, including eleven starts, and scored seven tries. He was nominated for EPCR European Player of the Year in 2019. For Ireland, he won eleven caps, including five in the 2019 Six Nations Championship and four at the 2019 Rugby World Cup, and scored three tries, including one in Ireland's first ever victory against the All Blacks on Irish soil,

In 2019–20 he made 13 appearances, all starts, for Ulster, and scored two tries. For Ireland, he won five caps in the 2020 Six Nations Championship. In 2020-21 he made 14 appearances, all starts, for Ulster, and scored three tries. For Ireland, he won five caps three in the 2020 Autumn Nations Cup, one in the 2021 Six Nations Championship, and one against Japan in July 2021. In 2021–22, he injured his ankle in Ulster's opening United Rugby Championship match against Glasgow Warriors, which kept him out for the rest of the season, eventually requiring surgery in January 2022.

Stockdale is a Christian (his father is a Presbyterian minister), and prays before each game.

Statistics

International tries

Correct as of 3 July 2021

Honours

Ireland
Six Nations Championship:
Winner (1): 2018	
Grand Slam:
Winner (1): 2018
Triple Crown:
Winner (1): 2018

Awards
Ulster Schools Player of the Year, 2014
Ulster Rugby Young Player of the Year, 2017
Six Nations Player of the Championship, 2018
BBC Northern Ireland Sports Personality of the Year, 2018
Nominated for EPCR European Player of the Year, 2019

References

External links

Ulster Rugby profile
United Rugby Championship profile
Ireland profile

1996 births
Living people
Irish rugby union players
Sportspeople from Lisburn
Rugby union centres
Rugby union wings
Ulster Rugby players
Ireland international rugby union players
Rugby union fullbacks
Rugby union players from County Armagh
Alumni of Ulster University